"She's Gone Gone Gone" is a country music song written by Harlan Howard and originally recorded by American singer Lefty Frizzell. Frizzell's version of the song reached number 12 on the Billboard Hot Country Singles & Tracks chart.

Critical reception
An uncredited review in Billboard said that the song has a "catchy rhythm but sad lyric" and that Frizzell "performs in his top fashion".

Chart performance

Carl Jackson version

In 1984, Carl Jackson covered the song. His version, released as his debut single for Columbia Records, peaked at number 44 on the same chart.

Chart performance

Glen Campbell version

"She's Gone, Gone, Gone" was also a single by American country music artist Glen Campbell.  It was released in September  1989 as the first single from the album Walkin' in the Sun. The song reached number 6 on the Billboard Hot Country Singles & Tracks chart. Campbell's version was his last Top 10 hit on this chart, and his only release for Jimmy Bowen's short-lived Universal label. The album itself was released via Capitol Records.

Chart performance

References

1965 singles
1984 debut singles
1989 singles
Lefty Frizzell songs
Carl Jackson songs
Glen Campbell songs
Songs written by Harlan Howard
Song recordings produced by Jimmy Bowen
Columbia Records singles
Capitol Records singles
1965 songs
Universal Records (1988) singles
Song recordings produced by Don Law